Pinanga sylvestris is a species of tree in the Arecaceae, or palm tree, family. It grows 2-6 m tall, sometimes in bundles, shade tolerant, from Meghalaya (India) to Thailand, Cambodia, Vietnam, Laos and Zhōngguó/China. In Thailand it is recorded in the Khao Soi Dao Wildlife Sanctuary, in Chanthaburi Province, as a very common mid-storey tree in the Quercus semiserrata-dominated rainforest at 1,400 to 1,540 m.  In Cambodia it occurs uncommonly in coastal vegetation communities, but is common in dense and semi-dense evergreen rainforest in the lowlands and at moderate altitude. The palm grows in similar dense and semi-dense communities in Laos and Vietnam. On the mountain of Ngọc Linh in Quảng Nam Province of Vietnam, it dominates the ground layer of low montane broadleaf evergreen forest, that occurs from 150 to 1000m.

References

sylvestris
Flora of Indo-China
Flora of China
Flora of Meghalaya